Julien Jeanpierre (born 10 March 1980) is a former professional tennis player from France.

Junior career
Jeanpierre was a world number one ranked junior and had wins over Roger Federer, Lleyton Hewitt and David Nalbandian during his junior years.

In 1996, he was the U16 Orange Bowl champion.

He and Arnaud Di Pasquale were doubles runners-up in the 1997 French Open.

The Frenchman won both the boys' singles and doubles titles at the 1998 Australian Open. In the singles he defeated Sweden's Andreas Vinciguerra in the final and in the doubles he partnered Jérôme Haehnel.

Junior Grand Slam finals

Singles: 1 (1 title)

Doubles: 2 (1 title, 1 runner-up)

ATP Tour
Jeanpierre appeared in his first men's Grand Slam event at the 1998 French Open. He only competed in the doubles, with Di Pasquale. The pair were defeated in the opening round by Danny Sapsford and Chris Wilkinson.

He reached the third round of the 2004 French Open, as a qualifier, winning both of his matches in straight sets, over Slovakian Karol Beck and 27th seed Vincent Spadea. Countryman Michaël Llodra then ended his run. Jeanpierre also took part in the doubles with Édouard Roger-Vasselin and they made it into the second round, defeating Julien Boutter and Antony Dupuis.

Performance timelines

Singles

ATP Challenger and ITF Futures finals

Singles: 12 (8–4)

Doubles: 26 (10–16)

References

1980 births
Living people
French male tennis players
Australian Open (tennis) junior champions
People from Remiremont
Sportspeople from Vosges (department)
Grand Slam (tennis) champions in boys' singles
Grand Slam (tennis) champions in boys' doubles